The 1929–30 season was Port Vale's 11th consecutive season of football (24th overall) in the English Football League, and their first in the Third Division North. They finished as champions and were thus promoted back to the Second Division. With 67 points they broke a division record. After winning the North Staffordshire & District League in 1909–10 it was their first league title, as well as their first ever promotion in the Football League. They also racked up a still-standing club record Football League wins in a season, winning 30 of their 42 games. They were the most southerly team in the North Division.

Despite all the joys of the season there was some considerable solemnity at the season's start, with manager Joe Schofield dying following an illness, his team top of the table.

Overview

Third Division North
The pre-season saw the directors spend some of the £2,600 they received in the sale of Wilf Kirkham. In came Tom Baxter (Wolverhampton Wanderers), Frank Watkin (Stoke City), Sam Jennings (Nottingham Forest), Arthur Brown (Reading), and Bill Cope (Bolton Wanderers). Jennings was a proven goalscorer, whilst Brown had kept goal for Wales. The run included a 5–0 win over Barrow and 5–1 victory over New Brighton, with Albert Pynegar scoring a hat-trick in the latter game.

The season started well, continued at a high tempo, and finished in style. Winning ten of their opening eleven games, Vale marked themselves as promotion favourites early on. However during this sequence tragedy struck on 29 September with the death of manager Joe Schofield, aged 58, following a short illness. The Sentinel described him as a man adept at developing young players, who remained close to his players in order to help them realize their full potential. His funeral took place on 3 October, with Stoke City fans also mourning his death, as he had managed both clubs – the only man ever to do so. Tom Morgan moved out of the backroom staff to take charge for the remainder of the season.

In mid-October, the side suffered a mini-slump, drawing three games in a row. To rectify things Bill Rawlings was signed from Manchester United for a four-figure fee, Ben Davies also arrived from Crewe Alexandra in a straight swap for Arthur Brown. Five wins on the bounce followed. Two defeats to Stockport County within two days (Christmas and Boxing day) left the race for the title open despite the "Valiants" excellent start. Despite having nine players out injured the Vale marched on, winning nine and drawing two of their following eleven games. This included a 4–0 win over Carlisle United and a 7–1 mauling over Rotherham United – Frank Watkin scoring five in the latter match.

Just as Vale were looking unbeatable Jack Mandley was sold to Aston Villa for £5,000. Protestations from the supporters were quelled slightly by the arrival of Harry Marshall from Wolves. They slumped in March, winning two, losing two and drawing one. Despite being top of the league a small minority of fans began protesting against the directors. The final four games were all away, and Stockport were still breathing down the Vale's necks. However all four games were won, with sixteen goals scored in the final five games of the season. They took the title at Crewe Alexandra's Gresty Road, with 1,000 supporters cheering them on.

They finished as champions with 67 points from 42 matches, then a division record. This put them seventeen points clear of third-placed Darlington, and four points clear of Stockport. The previous season County had finished one point off champions Bradford City. Vale were one of five teams in the Football League to score a century of league goals (the others Sheffield Wednesday, West Bromwich Albion, Stockport County, and Darlington). Sam Jennings and Albert Pynegar scored nearly fifty goals combined. They conceded just 37 goals, less than any other team in the four divisions. At a Burslem Town Hall reception 2,000 supporters congratulated the team on their achievement, amongst them Stoke's Wilf Kirkham.

Finances
On the financial side, a profit of £363 was made. Yet attendances were again a concern, a £725 drop in gate receipts saw an intake of just £13,302 on the gates. Wages came to £8,079. The directors again began talk of moving stadia to Cobridge. Leaving the club were Robert Gillespie, Jack Prince, and Bill Rawlings; they left for Wrexham, Rochdale, and New Milton respectively.

Cup competitions
In the FA Cup, Vale progressed into the Second Round after beating Gainsborough Trinity 5–0 in a replay. During the first encounter Bob Connelly made his 122nd consecutive appearance, but was injured during the rough match. They then came up against league rivals Chesterfield at Saltergate. Chesterfield would win all but three of their home games in the league, and were equally stubborn opposition for the "Valiants", who they defeated 2–0.

League table

Results
Port Vale's score comes first

Football League Third Division North

Results by matchday

Matches

FA Cup

North Staffordshire Royal Infirmary Cup

Player statistics

Appearances

Top scorers

Transfers

Transfers in

Transfers out

References
Specific

General

Port Vale F.C. seasons
Port Vale